Hesperange is a commune and town in southern Luxembourg. It is located south-east of Luxembourg City.

The total population of the commune is 14.701 people. This breaks down into 6.909 Luxembourgers, 2.021 French, 1.758 Portuguese, 1.052 Italians, 627 Belgians, 514 Germans, 241 Spanish, 207 British, 190 Polish, 106 Dutch, and 1.076 persons of other nationalities. (2014 official data)

, the town of Hesperange, which lies in the centre of the commune, has a population of 2.651.  Other towns within the commune include Alzingen, Fentange, Howald, and Itzig.  Each of these five towns has a population of over 1,000, making Hesperange unique amongst Luxembourgian communes in having five towns with over a thousand inhabitants (see: List of towns in Luxembourg by population).

The mayor of the commune is Marc Lies.

Hesperange Castle, now a ruin, has a history dating from the 13th century.

Hesperange has a park called Hesper Park which has a memorial commemorating the death of three American soldiers who died in a tank accident on the nearby bridge over the Alzette river on 26 December 1944 during the Battle of the Bulge.

Population

Twin towns — sister cities

Hesperange is twinned with:
 Malchin, Germany
 Szerencs, Hungary

Sports
Hesperange is home of FC Swift Hesperange, a football club that plays in the top-flight National Division.  The club's home games are played at Stade Alphonse Theis.  They have won the Luxembourg Cup on one occasion (1989–90).

Gallery

References

External links
 
 Commune de Hesperange (Municipality of Hesperange)
 Friends of the History of Hesperange
 Hesperange Schools

 
Communes in Luxembourg (canton)
Towns in Luxembourg
Alzette